Rafael Rey Rey (born February 26, 1954) is a Peruvian engineer, political commentator and politician who currently serves as member of the Central Reserve Bank of Peru Board of Directors since 2016. Throughout his political life, he served in the Peruvian Congress from 1990 to 2006 and as a Representative to the Andean Parliament from 2006 to 2016. During the Second presidency of Alan García, he was appointed Minister of Production, Ambassador to Italy and Minister of Defense.

In 2010, Rey was selected by Keiko Fujimori as her first running mate in the 2011 general election with the Force 2011 ticket alongside ex-minister Jaime Yoshiyama, being ultimately defeated by Ollanta Humala's Peru Wins ticket. Simultaneously, he was reelected to the Andean Parliament as the Force 2011 representative with more than 470,000 votes, the best result for any candidate nationwide.

Rey is recognized as one of the most representative conservative politicians of Peru. He founded and led the now-defunct National Renewal, a conservative party which formed as part of the National Unity Alliance for the 2001 and 2006 general elections.

Early life and education 

Rafael Rey was born to engineering professor Ricardo Rey Polis and Elsa Rey Elmore. He started his education at the Catholic college of San Isidro, owned by Marist Brothers. From 1971 to 1979 Rey studied Industrial Engineering at the University of Piura, where his father was first Rector, and the Catholic University of Peru. From 1982 to 1990 he was CEO of Crowley Peru S.A.

Since 1991 Rey has been Executive President of the NPO Pro-Educación.

Political career

Early political career 

In 1987 he joined the pro-market Liberty Movement of Nobel laureate writer Mario Vargas Llosa which became part of the 1988 established broad liberal-conservative Democratic Front (FREDEMO). Rey represented his party as Deputy National Secretary for Ideology and Culture in 1989 and Departmental Secretary for Lima from October 1989 to August 1992. In the polarised 1990 general elections, he was elected Member of the Chamber of Deputies under the FREDEMO ticket whereas the leader of the alliance, Vargas Llosa, was defeated in the presidential race by Alberto Fujimori of Cambio 90. After Fujimori's self-coup during the constitutional crisis in 1992 and the decline of FREDEMO, Rey left the Liberty Movement and formed his own party, the National Renewal in August 1992, which he has chaired ever since.

Congressman 

Rafael Rey was elected Member of the so-called Democratic Constitutional Congress under the new unicameral constitution in 1992. He was re-elected Congressman for the National Renewal in 1995 and in 2000 as part of the Avancemos alliance led by Federico Salas who was afterwards appointed Prime Minister by President Fujimori. In the 2001 early elections caused by the corruption crisis leading to Fujimori's resignation, Rey contested as part of the Christian Democrats-led National Unity alliance of presidential candidate Lourdes Flores and was re-elected to the Congress. In 2006, he was voted one of five Peruvian representatives to the Andean Parliament, again on the ballot of Flores' National Unity.

Minister in the García administration 

As President Alan García of the social democratic Peruvian Aprista Party did not have a stable majority in Congress, he and his changing Prime Ministers tried to win multi-partisan support. Thus they appointed Rey twice to their governments, as Minister of Production from 2006 to 2008, and as Minister of Defense for a short period from 2009 to 2010. In between he served as Ambassador to Italy for from February to July 2009. His participation in Garcia's government led to the break with Flores and her oppositional National Unity Alliance.

Presidential election 2011 

In the 2011 general election Rafael Rey changed sides and allied with Fujimori's daughter Keiko. He was the candidate for First Vice President on the Force 2011 ticket. Keiko Fujimori lost to left-wing Ollanta Humala in the second round on June 5. Nevertheless, Rey was re-elected to the Andean Parliament as the Force 2011 representative with more than 470,000 votes, the best result for any candidate nationwide.

Member of the Central Reserve Bank of Peru Board of Directors 
On October 27, 2016, he was elected by Congress as Director of the Central Reserve Bank of Peru (BCRP).  This election generated controversy, since it was believed that Rafael Rey had no studies or experience in economic matters or monetary policy Due to a statement where Rey Rey commented that the experience he has in these matters is that "that every person with common sense has" and indicated the following: "Of course I have to study and proceed with the prudence of the case and the position require ". However, later Rey himself clarified that he had taken his statements incompletely, since what he had said was that "in addition to having the knowledge and professional experience, he would proceed with great prudence to study the reports and reports that would reach him as director of the BCR ”.

Personal life
Rey is a numerary member of Opus Dei.  During the COVID-19 pandemic in Peru, Rey announced that he contracted the virus on March 20, 2020.

References

1954 births
National Unity (Peru) politicians
Government ministers of Peru
Defense ministers of Peru
Members of the Chamber of Deputies of Peru
Members of the Congress of the Republic of Peru
Members of the Democratic Constituent Congress
Opus Dei members
Peruvian people of Spanish descent
National Renewal (Peru) politicians
Living people
Fujimorista politicians